This page is devoted to the film and television work of Francis X. Bushman. They encompass the years 1911-66.

1911

His Friend's Wife as The Artist First lead role in 1911 and Protagonist 
The Rosary as Young Payne Second lead role in 1911 and Protagonist 
Her Dad the Constable as Tom Thornton Third lead role in 1911 and Protagonist 
God's Inn by the Sea as Chaplain Crandall Fourth lead role in 1911 and Protagonist 
The New Manager as Phillip Carlton Fifth Lead role in 1911 and Protagonist 
The Gordian Knot as Harry Robins Sixth lead role in 1911 and Protagonist 
Live, Love and Believe as Harry Ainsworth Seventh lead role in 1911 and Protagonist 
Fate's Funny Frolic as Richard Malcolm Eighth lead role in 1911 and Protagonist 
The Playwright as Frank Richardson Ninth lead role in 1911 and Protagonist 
Putting It Over as George Moore Tenth lead role in 1911 and Protagonist 
The Dark Romance of a Tobacco Tin as George M. Jackson Eleventh lead role in 1911 and Protagonist
Two Men and a Girl as John Lincoln Twelfth Lead role in 1911 and Protagonist 
The Burglarized Burglar as Howard Graham Thirteenth Lead role in 1911 and Protagonist 
Saved from the Torrents as Arthur Chester Fourteenth Lead role in 1911 and Protagonist 

Lost Years as James Brown Fifteenth in 1911 lead role and Protagonist 
Reparation as David Warren Sixteenth lead role in 1911 and Protagonist 
A False Suspicion as John Barton, The Husband Seventeenth lead role in 1911 and Protagonist 
Pals as Fred Eighteenth lead role in 1911 and Protagonist 
Bill Bumper's Bargain as Mephisto 19th lead role in 1911 and Protagonist 
He Fought for the U.S.A. as Frank Langdon - First Brother 20th lead role in 1911 and Protagonist
The Empty Saddle as John Twenty First lead role in 1911 and Protagonist 
Too Much Turkey as himself Main Character 
The Quinceville Raffle as Ezra Higgins Twenty Second lead role in 1911 and Protagonist 
The Madman as The Madman Twenty Third lead role in 1911 and Protagonist 
The Long Strike as Jim Blakely Twenty Fourth lead role in 1911 and Protagonist 
The Goodfellow's Christmas Eve as James Sawyer Twenty Fifth lead role in 1911 and Protagonist 
For Memory's Sake as Jim Twenty Sixth lead role in 1911 and Protagonist

1912

Daydream of a Photoplay Artist (*short)
The Mail Order Wife (*short)
The Old Florist (*short)
The Little Poet (*short)
Alias Billy Sargent (*short)
A Brother's Error (*short)
The Hospital Baby (*short)
The Melody of Love (*short)
Her Boys (*short)
Tracked Down (*short)
The Little Black Box (*short)
The Turning Point (*short)
Out of the Depths (*short)
At the End of the Trail (*short)
Teaching a Liar a Lesson (*short)
Lonesome Robert (*short)
The Rivals (*short)
Napatia, the Greek Singer
Out of the Night (*short)
The Eye That Never Sleeps (*short)
A Good Catch (*short)
The Laurel Wreath of Fame (*short)
The Mis-Sent Letter (*short)
The Passing Show (*short)
Return of William Marr (*short)

Billy and the Butler (*short)
White Roses (*short)
The Butterfly Net (*short)
Signal Lights (*short)
The Understudy (*short)
Her Hour of Triumph (*short)
The New Church Organ (*short)
The Old Wedding Dress (*short)
The Magic Wand (*short)
Twilight (*short)
The Fall of Montezuma(*short)
Neptune's Daughter(*short)
The Voice of Conscience(*short)
The End of the Feud (*short)
The Warning Hand (*short)
Chains(*short)
When Wealth Torments (*short)
The House of Pride (*short)
The Penitent (*short)
The Iron Heel (*short)
The Error of Omission (*short)
The Virtue of Rags (*short)
The Cat's Paw (*short)
Requited Love (*short)

1913

Little Ned (*short)
When Soul Meets Soul (*short)(extant;Library of Congress)
The Thirteenth Man (*short)
The Farmer's Daughter (*short)
The Discovery (*short)
A Mistaken Accusation (*short)
The Pathway of Years (*short)
The Spy's Defeat (*short)
Let No Man Put Asunder (*short)
A Brother's Loyalty (*short)
The Whip Hand (*short)
The Power of Conscience (*short)

The Hermit of Lonely Gulch (*short)
Sunlight (*short)
The Right of Way (*short)
For Old Time's Sake (*short)
Tony, the Fiddler (*short)
Dear Old Girl (*short)
The Way Perilous (*short)
The Toll of the Marshes (*short)
The Little Substitute (*short)
The Stigma (*short)

1914

Hearts and Flowers (Short) as John Martin
The Hour and the Man (Short) as Frank Maxwell
Through the Storm (Short) as Andy Burton
The Girl at the Curtain (Short) as Warren Bradley
Dawn and Twilight (Short) as Pietro Delani, a Blind Musician
The Other Girl (Short) as Frank Dixon
Shadows (Short) as Secret Service Agent Dan Grayson
The Three Scratch Clue (Short) as Norman Arnold
In the Moon's Ray (Short) as Richard Neal
The Man for A'That (Short) as Frank Willard
Yarn a-Tangle (Short)
The Mystery of Room 643 (Short) as Richard Neal
Mongrel and Master (Short) as Frank Mitchell, the Master
Ashes of Hope (Short) as Fred Willard
The Voice in the Wilderness (Short) as Frank - the Author
Blood Will Tell (Short) as Richard Brimsmore
The Elder Brother (Short) as Dr. Phillip Caldwell - the Elder Brother
Jane (Short) as The Red-Haired Man
Finger Prints (Short) as Richard Neal
The Countess (Short) as Richard Hasbrook
Trinkets of Tragedy (Short) as Harrison Hyde
A Night with a Million (Short) as Jack Wilton
The Night Hawks (Short) as Humphrey
His Stolen Fortune (Short) as Frank Wentworth
One Wonderful Night
The Motor Buccaneers (Short) as William Mash
The Masked Wrestler (Short) as Louis de Luzon
Ambushed (Short) as Frank Mitchell
Under Royal Patronage (Short) as Richard Savage
The Plum Tree (Short) as Craig Ewell
Sparks of Fate (Short) as Frank Graham
A Splendid Dishonor (Short) as Frank Sergeant
The Other Man (Short) as Harry Ross
In the Glare of the Lights (Short) as Glen Duval
The Private Officer (Short) as Harry Lampton / Lt. Frothingham
The Unplanned Elopement (Short) as Frank Melbourne
The Prince Party (Short) as Prince Francis of Fournia
Scars of Possession (Short) as Payne Forsythe
The Battle of Love as Arthur Chandler

1915
The Fable of the Bush League Lover Who Failed to Qualify (Short) as The Matinee Idol
Every Inch a King (Short) as King Leofric of Vidonia
The Battle of Love as Arthur Chandler
Any Woman's Choice (Short) as The Mutual Friend
The Shanty at Trembling Hill (Short) as Richard Scott
The Gallantry of Jimmy Rodgers (Short) as Jimmy Rodgers
The Ambition of the Baron (Short) as Count Jean de Lugnan
Thirteen Down (Short) as Arnold Austin
The Accounting (Short) as Gordon Bannock
Stars Their Courses Change (Short) as Robert Cameron
The Great Silence (Short) as John Landon
Graustark (survives) as Grenfall Lorry
The Return of Richard Neal (Short) as Richard Neal
Thirty (Short) as Dick Thompson
The Slim Princess as Alexander H. Pike
Providence and Mrs. Urmy (Short) as Barton the Chauffeur & Lord Chilminster
The Second in Command (survives) as Lt. Col. Miles Anstruther
The Silent Voice as Franklyn Starr
Pennington's Choice (survives) as Robert Pennington

1916
Man and His Soul as John Conscience / John Power
The Red Mouse
The Wall Between (survives)
A Million A Minute as Stephen Quaintance
The Voice in the Darkness (Short)
A Virginia Romance (Short) as Ralph Everly
In the Diplomatic Service (survives) as Dick Stansbury
Romeo and Juliet as Romeo

1917
The Great Secret as William Montgomery Strong
Their Compact as James Van Dyke Moore
 The Adopted Son as Two Gun Carter
The Voice of Conscience (survives) as William Poatter / James Houston
 Red, White and Blue Blood as John Spaulding

1918
Under Suspicion as Gerry Simpson
The Brass Check as Richard Trevor
With Neatness and Dispatch as Paul Donaldson
Cyclone Higgins, D.D. as Cyrus 'Cyclone' Higgins, D.D.
Social Quicksands as Warren Dexter
 A Pair of Cupids as Peter Warburton

1919
The Poor Rich Man (survives) as Vantyne Carter
 God's Outlaw as Andrew Craig
Daring Hearts as Hugh Brown

1920s
Smiling All the Way (1920) as Doubtful Cameo Appearance (uncredited)
 According to Hoyle (1922)
Making the Grade (1922)
Modern Marriage (1923, survives) as Hugh Varley
The Masked Bride (1925) as Grover
Ben-Hur (1925) as Messala
Playing the Swell (1926, Short)
The Marriage Clause (1926 Survives in a one reel cut down version) as Barry Townsend
The Lady in Ermine (1927) as Gen. Dostal
The Flag (1927, Short) as George Washington
The Thirteenth Juror (1927) as Henry Desmond
Una nueva y gloriosa nacion (1928) as Belgrano
The Grip of the Yukon (1928) as Colby MacDonald
Say It with Sables (1928) as John Caswell
Midnight Life (1928) as Jim Logan

1930s
Call of the Circus (1930) as The Man
 The Dude Wrangler (1930) as Canby
Once a Gentleman (1930) as Bannister
Watch Beverly (1932) as President Orloff
Hollywood Boulevard (1936) as Frank - Director, Desert Scene
Dick Tracy (1937, Serial) as Chief Clive Anderson
Thoroughbreds Don't Cry (1937) as Racing Steward (uncredited)

1940s
Peer Gynt (1941) (voice)
Mr. Celebrity (1941) as himself
Silver Queen (1942) as Creditor
Wilson (1944) as Bernard Baruch (uncredited)

1950s
Hollywood Story (1951) as himself
David and Bathsheba (1951) as King Saul (uncredited)
Apache Country (1952) as Commissioner Latham
The Bad and the Beautiful (1952) as Eulogist (uncredited)
Sabrina (1954) as Mr. Tyson
The Story of Mankind (1957) as Moses

1960s
12 to the Moon (1960) as Secretary General of the International Space Order
The Phantom Planet (1961) as Sessom
The Ghost in the Invisible Bikini (1966) as Malcolm

External links

Bushman, Francis X.
Bushman, Francis X.
Bushman, Francis X.